Joshua Luke Files (born 9 January 1991) is a British racing driver currently competing in the TCR International Series. Having previously competed in the Renault Clio Cup United Kingdom and Eurocup Clio amongst others. Files won both championships in 2013.

Racing career

Files began his career in 2009 in the Thoroughbred Sports Cars series, he raced there until 2010, winning the championship that year. He switched to the Renault Clio Cup United Kingdom for 2011, finishing 7th in the championship standings in his rookie season. He took 4 pole positions in 2012, finishing 6th in the standings. In 2013 he took 5 pole positions and 2 victories on his way to winning the championship. He also raced in the Eurocup Clio series in 2013, also winning the championship that year, with 4 pole positions and 4 wins. He continued in the Eurocup Clio series in 2014. He also raced a guest entry in the 2014 Porsche Carrera Cup Great Britain season that year. In 2015 he raced in the Clio Cup Italia series, finishing 3rd in the standings.

In November 2015 it was announced that he would race in the TCR International Series, driving an Opel Astra OPC for Campos Racing.

The Brit joined Target Competition to race at the 2016 ADAC TCR Germany Touring Car Championship. He scored six wins in 14 races and claimed the title. During the off-season, he claimed the 2017 TCR Middle East Series, winning all races he entered.

Racing record

Career summary

† As Files was a guest driver, he was ineligible for points.
* Season still in progress.

Complete TCR International Series results
(key) (Races in bold indicate pole position) (Races in italics indicate fastest lap)

Complete TCR Europe Touring Car Series results
(key) (Races in bold indicate pole position) (Races in italics indicate fastest lap)

† Driver did not finish, but was classified as he completed over 75% of the race distance.

Complete TCR Malaysia Touring Car Championship results
(key) (Races in bold indicate pole position) (Races in italics indicate fastest lap)

Complete World Touring Car Cup results
(key) (Races in bold indicate pole position) (Races in italics indicate fastest lap)

References

External links
 

1991 births
Living people
TCR International Series drivers
English racing drivers
British racing drivers
Porsche Carrera Cup GB drivers
Renault UK Clio Cup drivers
World Touring Car Cup drivers
Campos Racing drivers
KCMG drivers
Hyundai Motorsport drivers
Engstler Motorsport drivers
TCR Europe Touring Car Series drivers